The World Darts Federation (WDF) is a sport governing body and (along with the PDC) a tournament organiser for the game of darts. It was formed in 1974 by representatives of the original fourteen founding members. Membership is open to the national organizing body for darts in all nations. The WDF encourages the promotion of the sport of darts among and between those bodies, in an effort to gain international recognition for darts as a major sport. The WDF is a full member of Global Association of International Sports Federations, which is the governing body for international sports federations.

The WDF stages a world championship (called the WDF World Cup), as well as continental championships such as the WDF Americas Cup, the WDF Asia-Pacific Cup and the WDF Europe Cup. The country that is first in the overall leader board (overall best result in the two events, singles, pairs, teams) becomes the world champion. Winners of any of the events can also call themselves the official World Champion. Winners of continental championships can call themselves the official champion of their own areas.

After the collapse of the British Darts Organisation in September 2020, the WDF announced plans to launch the WDF World Championship and WDF World Masters. Both competitions took place for the first time in 2022, starting with the 2022 WDF World Darts Championship in April.

Members
70 national full members 6 national interim members (Bahrain, Ghana, Guernsey,  Liechtenstein, Palestine and Uganda):

 
 
 
 
 
 
 
 
 
 
 
 
 
 
 
 
 
 
 
 
 
 
 
 
 
 
 
 
 
 
 
 
 
 
 
 
 
 
 
 
 
 
 
 
 
 
 
 
 
 
 
 
 
 
 
 
 
 
 
 
 
 
 
 
 
 
 
 
 
 
 
 
 
 
 
 

The WDF Rankings, as defined by the World Darts Federation, are the "objective merit-based method used for determining qualification for entry and seeding in all of its tournaments for both male and female singles, pairs and team". The rankings tables are "rolling tables", and points from an event are counted until that event occurs the following year. If a particular event does not occur in the following year, points are deleted after a calendar year.

Tournament levels and points allocation
A player's WDF Ranking is based on the points they have accrued from their best 10 performances over the previous 12 month rolling period. 
The eligible tournaments include a selection of Platinum, Gold, Silver, and Bronze level tournaments with decreasing points at each level.

Since the formation of the WDF rankings in 1974 the method used to calculate a player's ranking points has changed several times.
Notes: The WDF international tournaments have six categories for both men and women (singles, pairs and teams)

Current points distribution
Points are currently awarded as follows:

Current WDF World Rankings
The rankings are based on a cumulative points system similar to ATP rankings in tennis they are done on a rolling one year basis. When a tournament is played, the previous year's results are removed from the rankings. This list is used to determine seeds for some of the WDF Opens. The World Darts Federation also have a ranking system designed to provide a measure of the global activities of darts players in every WDF recognised darts event. It used to be very similar to the BDO system but was revised in January 2007 to include categories by country and by events, and the distribution of ranking points reflect the levels of prize money on offer and the numbers of entries in a tournament. Therefore, the WDF World Rankings give a better reflection on BDO player world ranking. The leading players gain points in different levels of categorized events and prize money and at the end of the season the leading players receive monetary bonus rewards from the WDF.

WDF World No1 men's and women's players (1976–current)

The rankings show Deta Hedman and Trina Gulliver as consistently being the leading women's player's, having been number one on a record ten occasions each. No male player has held the number one position as many years Gulliver and Hedman, although  Eric Bristow has held the top position for a record six times. The rankings for the men has become even more complex since the inception of the Professional Darts Corporation (PDC) formerly the World Darts Council (WDC). The leading ranked players in 1993/94 split from the BDO and they have their own world ranking system known as the Order of Merit. The players from the PDC are not included in the rankings because the BDO, which is the British governing body of amateur darts, is the one that is recognised by the WDF.

WDF tournaments

See also
SportAccord

References

Sources

External links
World Darts Federation (WDF)
British Darts Organisation (BDO)
Professional Darts Corporation (PDC)
Catalan Darts Federation (FCD)
Latvia Darts Organisation (LDO)
Polish Darts Organisation (PDO)
Romanian Darts Organisation (BDO)

Darts organizations
Sports organizations established in 1976